Giuseppe Carozzi (Milan, 1864 – Monaco, 1938) was an Italian painter.

Biography
He first studied painting with Riccardo Pasquini in Turin, then studied medicine and law at Bologna, and finally returning to Milan and to painting, he frequented the studios of Leonardo Bazzaro and Filippo Carcano. His style of painting was influenced by Segantini and the writings of Vittore Grubicy on Divisionism. He initially painted genre scenes of the lagoon of Venice. His Vedute di Chioggia and I paesaggi montani won him the Fumagalli prize in 1897 at the Triennale di Milan. He had an individual exhibit at the 1912 Venice Biennale. His later work consisted mainly of alpine valley farms and fields.

References

1864 births
1938 deaths
Painters from Milan
19th-century Italian painters
Italian male painters
20th-century Italian painters
Divisionist painters
19th-century Italian male artists
20th-century Italian male artists